The Dunning's miner bee (Andrena dunningi) is a species of miner bee in the family Andrenidae. It is found in North America.

References

Further reading

 
 

dunningi
Articles created by Qbugbot
Insects described in 1898